is a 2006 Japanese film directed by Kozo Nagayama.  The film is an extension to the original drama series Tokyo Friends with the same cast and plot. The film was noted for being Ai Otsuka's debut in theatre.

Plot 
At the end of the TV series, Rei began to gain fame as a rising vocalist for The Survival Company. Ryuuji's band though was involved in triad activities and was disbanded. Ryuuji moved to New York City to restart his life. Upon discovering that Ryuuji is in New York, Rei flew to New York to meet him just before an important concert that could make her a real star in Japan.

Cast 
 Ai Otsuka as Rei Iwatsuki
 Rio Matsumoto as Hirono Hayama
 Yōko Maki as Ryōko Fujiki
 Mao Kobayashi as Maki Abiko
 Eita as Ryūji Shintani
 Yuta Hiraoka as Hidetoshi Tanaka
 Shunta Nakamura as Mitsuo Nagase
 Takashi Ito as Oku-chan
 Ryuta Sato as Kenichi Satomi
 Kuranosuke Sasaki as Kohashi
 Arata Furuta as Wada
 Kazuki Kitamura as Keitaro Sasakawa
 Masanobu Katsumura as Kazuo Sasakawa
Reference:

Footnotes

External links 
  
 Tokyo Friends: The Movie at JFDB
 

2006 films
Films directed by Kozo Nagayama
2000s Japanese-language films
2006 romantic drama films
Japanese romantic drama films
2000s Japanese films

ja:東京フレンズ